Belgium competed at the 2015 European Games, in Baku, Azerbaijan from 12 to 28 June 2015.

Medalists

Archery

Badminton

Men

Women

Mixed

Basketball

Men

Women

Boxing

Men

Canoe Sprint

Men

Women

Cycling

Road
Men

Women

Mountain biking

BMX
Men

Women

Fencing

Men

Women

Gymnastics

Acrobatic

Team

Artistic

Men
Team

Women
Team

Trampoline
Belgium qualified one athlete based on the results at the 2014 European Trampoline Championships.

Judo 

Men

Women

Karate

Shooting

Men

Women

Swimming

Men

Women

Table tennis

Men

Women

Taekwondo

Men

Women

Triathlon

Men

Women

Volleyball

Both the men's team and women's team have qualified.

Men's tournament

Group play

Women's tournament

Group play

References

Nations at the 2015 European Games
European Games
2015